Laurus novocanariensis is a large shrub or tree with aromatic, shiny dark-green foliage. belonging to the evergreen tree genus Laurus of the laurel family, Lauraceae. The genus includes three species, whose diagnostic key characters often overlap. Under favorable conditions it is an impressive tree of 3 to 20 m. tall. It is native of rich soils in the cloud zone of always moist spots in subtropical climate with a high air-humidity, on the Canary and Madeira islands.

The species was formerly included in Laurus azorica, a species that is now restricted to the Azores.

Description
The laurel is dioecious (unisexual), with male and female flowers on separate plants. Each flower is fragrant creamy white flower, about 1 cm diameter, and they are born in pairs beside a leaf. The canary laurel is a vigorous, conical tree.

This is a tree up to 20 m in height, which can be distinguished by its lanceolate leaves, which have small glands in the angle between the central vein and the lateral veins. The fruits are ovoid, 1–1.5 cm, and become black when ripe.
Evergreen tree that reaches 20 feet tall and highly branched, rather dense canopy, trunk and branches with green to gray, buds are brown.

It has fragrant creamy white flowers. It flowers from November to April. The fruit is a berry olive-like seed each. Large, shiny dark green, broadly lanceolate to ovoid leaves. These have a much finer, very exquisite aroma in contrast to the strongly scented leaves of Laurus nobilis. Easily cultivated in any humus rich, well drained soil in a sunny (winter) to partially shaded (summer) spot. Keep plants slightly drier in winter at a minimum of some 5 °C. Sow small avocado-like seeds in any humus rich, slightly moist soil. Keep at some 20 °C to 20 °C. Germination will start after some 4 to 6 weeks. Keep seedlings cooler, yet frostfree with reduced watering in winter in a sunny spot.

The flower is small, unisexual, yellowish-white, and arranged in axillary crests. The fruit is an ovoid berry, black when mature.
Leaves have 5 to 17 cm long, petiolate and alternate. Form available variables: ovate elliptic oblong lanceolate ... and leathery, deep green and glossy, more for the beam on the underside.
It is a dioecious species, i.e., individuals female, named locally laurel, whose flowers are bearing fruit, like an olive green to black when ripe, and male specimens, named "loro", whose flowers are characterized by having many stamens but produce no fruit. On being a dioecious plant need to fertilize seeds to have in the same population male and female specimens.

In the trunks of this species is common to find the gall, resulting from the action of a fungus (Laurobasidium lauri), also known as Madrelouro.

Distribution
Laurus novocanariensis is a species characteristic of the laurisilva forests of Macaronesia, but only native to the archipelagos of Madeira and the western and central Canary Islands. It is commonly associated with Apollonias barbujana and Ocotea foetens.

Until 2004 it was considered the same species as Laurus azorica, which is in danger of extinction. Though closely related to the Azorean species, it has significant genetic, morphological and physiological differences from the latter.

References

Lauraceae
Flora of Madeira
Flora of the Canary Islands
Endemic flora of Macaronesia
Taxobox binomials not recognized by IUCN